Abrahams Creek (also known as Abraham Creek, Abraham's Creek, Abram Creek, or Abrams Creek) is a tributary of the Susquehanna River in Luzerne County, Pennsylvania, in the United States. The watershed is divided into the upper Abraham Creek watershed and the lower Abraham Creek watershed, which are joined by a canyon known as The Hollow. The upper part of the watershed is mostly rural, but the lower part is heavily urbanized. The creek's channel has been heavily modified in many places. Its drainage basin is designated as a Coldwater Fishery and a Migratory Fishery.

Abrahams Creek is a perennial stream with relatively poor water quality. However, it is not considered to be impaired. Its pH ranges from slightly acidic to slightly alkaline and has a daily sediment load of nearly 14 million pounds (31 million kilograms) per day. The main rock formations in the watershed include the Catskill Formation, the Llewellyn Formation, the Pottsville Group, the Mauch Chunk Formation, and the Pocono Formation. The main soils include the Chenango-Pope-Holly soil, the Lackawanna-Arnot-Morris soil, the Udorthents-Urban Land-Volusia soil, and the Volusia-Mardin-Lordstown soil.

Abrahams Creek is named after a historic Mohawk chief known as Tigoransera or "Little Abraham". The creek's watershed was historically heavily logged and farmed, and a sediment retention structure was built in the watershed in the 1970s. Numerous bridges have been built over the creek since 1925. The Abrahams Creek Watershed Association operates in the watershed. A 500-million-gallon reservoir known as Frances Slocum Lake was built on the creek in 1965.

Course
Abrahams Creek begins in Franklin Township. It flows south-southwest for a short distance before turning south for several tenths of a mile, passing through the border between Dallas Township, Franklin Township, and Kingston Township, and entering Kingston Township. The creek then continues south for more than a mile before turning southeast and eventually entering Frances Slocum Lake. On the southeastern end of the lake, the creek turns east-northeast for more than a mile, entering a deep valley. It then turns south-southeast for a few miles, entering West Wyoming flowing through a water gap. The creek then turns southeast for some distance before turning southwest and entering Wyoming. It then turns west-southwest for a few miles before turning south and then west. The creek then turns south again, crossing US Route 11. It then turns southwest for more than a mile, entering Forty Fort and reaching its confluence with the Susquehanna River.

Tributaries
Hicks Creek was historically a tributary of Abrahams Creek. However, it was diverted to the northeast by strip mining in the 1940s and 1950s. It currently flows into the Susquehanna River. At present, Abrahams Creek has no officially named tributaries. However, it has six unnamed tributaries, two of which enter it from the left and four of which enter it from the right.

Hydrology and climate
Abrahams Creek likely has relatively poor water quality, especially in its lower reaches. However, it is not considered by the Pennsylvania Department of Environmental Protection to be impaired. The creek is a perennial stream. It has experienced erosion in some places. Further downstream, at West Wyoming, the discharge was measured twice in the 1960s.

A total of  comes from "transitional" land,  comes from cropland, and  comes from stream banks. A total of  comes from hay and pastures and  come from forested land. Low-intensity development contributes  of sediment per day, unpaved roads contribute , and coal mines contribute .  comes from high-intensity development,  comes from wetlands, and  comes from turf grass.

The concentration of recoverable iron was once measured to be .

The peak annual discharge of Abrahams Creek at US Route 11 has a 10 percent chance of reaching . It has a 2 percent chance of reaching  and a 1 percent chance of reaching . The peak annual discharge has a 0.2 percent chance of reaching .

It has a 2 percent chance of reaching  and a 1 percent chance of reaching . The peak annual discharge has a 0.2 percent chance of reaching . The peak annual discharge of Abrahams Creek at its mouth has a 10 percent chance of reaching . It has a 2 percent chance of reaching  and a 1 percent chance of reaching . The peak annual discharge has a 0.2 percent chance of reaching .

The creek's pH was close to neutral, ranging from 6.6 to 7.3.

Geography and geology
The lowest point in the watershed is at the creek's mouth.

There are plains to the north of Abrahams Creek. Wetlands known as the Abrahams Creek Wetlands are in the vicinity of the creek. They consist of several ponds along the side of the creek in Franklin Township, Kingston Township, and Dallas Township. The wetlands are listed on the Luzerne County Natural Areas Inventory. The creek is in entirely in the ridge and valley physiographic province, specifically, the Anthracite Valley Section. The Bunker Hill-Mount Lookout Ridge crosses the watershed and divides it into two drainage basins: the upper Abrahams Creek watershed, which consists of rolling hills, and the lower Abrahams Creek watershed, which is on a natural debris fan and the old floodplain of the Susquehanna River. Between the two is "The Hollow", a narrow canyon flowing through the ridge.

The course of Abrahams Creek has been altered by flood control projects. There is a sediment retention structure on the creek at the lower end of "The Hollow". Large portions of the creek, especially in its lower reaches, have undergone full stream channelization, with the stream channel being hardened by concrete or rock. In West Wyoming, a nearly mile-long stretch is lined with concrete. In the early 20th century, part of the creek above The Hollow had grouted stone walls, which were completed in the 1930s.

In the Abrahams Creek watershed, 94 percent of the rock is interbedded sedimentary rock. The remaining 6 percent is sandstone. The main rock formations in the watershed of Abrahams Creek include the Catskill Formation, the Llwellyn Formation, the Pottsville Group, the Mauch Chunk Formation, and the Pocono Formation. These formations mainly consist of coal, limestone, sandstone, shale, and siltstone. The Catskill Formation mainly occurs in the watershed's upper reaches. The Mauch Chunk Formation, the Pocono Formation, and the Pottsville Group occur under the Bunker Hill-Mount Lookout Ridge. The Llwellyn Formation also occurs there, in addition to underlying the floodplain in the watershed. A considerable area in the watershed has been strip mined.

The main soils in the watershed of Abrahams Creek include the Chenango-Pope-Holly soil, the Lackawanna-Arnot-Morris soil, the Udorthents-Urban Land-Volusia soil, and the Volusia-Mardin-Lordstown soil. The watershed's soils are in mostly the hydrologic soil groups B and C. However, the hydrological soil group D is also present.

Watershed
The creek's mouth is in the United States Geological Survey quadrangle of Pittston. However, its source is in the quadrangle of Kingston. The creek's watershed is situated in the northeastern part of Luzerne County and occupies portions of nine municipalities: Exeter, Forty Fort, Swoersville, West Wyoming, Wyoming, Dallas Township, Exeter Township, Franklin Township, and Kingston Township. The watershed is described as being hourglass-shaped in the Abrahams Creek Watershed Assessment and Project Prioritization.

A total of 80 percent of the Abrahams Creek watershed is rural and 20 percent is urbanized. The lower reaches of the watershed contain most of the urbanization. Its upper reaches contain second-growth forest, small patches of residential land, linear hedgerows, and agricultural land such as hay pastures, pastures, and farmland. The Bunker Hill-Mount Lookout Ridge is too steep to be developed, but many other areas of the watershed could easily be urbanized. The mining-affected land in the watershed is in West Wyoming.

A total of 51 percent of the watershed of Abrahams Creek consists of forested land. A total of 26 percent of the watershed consists of agricultural land and 18 percent is developed. The remaining 2 percent consists of "disturbed" land.

Abrahams Creek is the main source of flooding in West Wyoming, Forty Fort, and Swoyersville. Sheet flooding can occur when the creek floods over Eighth Street. There is a flood protection project for the creek in West Wyoming. This protection is capable of withstanding 100 year floods. The Slocum Dam, which is upstream of West Wyoming, also helps to reduce flooding on the creek. However, localized flooding and ponding frequently affect its lower reaches. The creek has been experienced extensive modifications, such as narrowing and riprap installation, in The Hollow to accommodate West Eighth Street.

Abrahams Creek flows through Frances Slocum State Park and passes through Frances Slocum Lake, a flood-control lake with a volume of half a billion gallons. Most of the upper reaches of the watershed drain into the lake. The creek is also dammed in this location. The lake was created in 1965 by the construction of an earthen dam across the creek. A pond known as Burketts Pond is on a tributary of the creek. It is partially filled and has a decaying stone dam. There are numerous other dammed ponds in the watershed's upper reaches. Historically, wetlands formed the sources of many headwater streams in the area, but many have been drained or flooded by impoundments.

The watershed of Abrahams Creek is continuing to become more developed, but at a slower rate than it has in the past. The lower reaches of the watershed are the most heavily urbanized, while the upper reaches are still largely rural. This has been the case as early 1893. The upper reaches of the watershed have a dendritic drainage system.

Abrahams Creek is one of 19 streams in Luzerne County to be designated for stormwater management.

History, name, and etymology
Abrahams Creek was entered into the Geographic Names Information System on August 2, 1979. Its identifier in the Geographic Names Information System is 1200061. The creek is also known as Abraham Creek, Abraham's Creek, Abram Creek, or Abrams Creek. The name "Abraham's Creek" was once the official name of the creek. It was also referred to by this name in an 1860 map.

Historically, the Mohicans had a settlement on the banks of Abrahams Creek. The creek is named after Abraham, a chief of that village.

Extensive logging and intense agriculture were historically done in the watershed of Abrahams Creek. The area was already beginning to experience road encroachment as early as 1893.

Several bridges have been built over Abrahams Creek. A concrete slab bridge carrying State Route 1021/East Eighth Street was built in 1925. A concrete stringer bridge carrying State Route 1010 was constructed over the creek in 1929. A concrete tee beam carrying US Route 11 was built in 1939. Another bridge carrying US Route 11 was built in Wyoming in 1953. A 2-span concrete tee beam bridge was constructed over the creek in 1962 in Wyoming. A steel culvert bridge carrying State Route 1044 was built in 1965. A prestressed box beam bridge carrying State Route 1036/Carverton Road was constructed over the creek in 1976. Four bridges over the creek are classified as being structurally deficient, as of 2007.

The entire watershed of Abrahams Creek, including all of the streams and wetlands, has been significantly modified by both historical and modern land uses in the area. The natural surface water hydrology of the watershed was substantially modified by projects of the United States Army Corps of Engineers and the Pennsylvania Department of Environmental Protection from the 1950s until the 1990s. The sediment retention structure in The Hollow was constructed in the 1970s.

Abrahams Creek has a watershed association known as the Abrahams Creek Watershed Association. It was awarded the Watershed Stewardship Award by the Luzerne Conservation District in 2009. The organization also received a $5000 grand from American Water for improving water quality, adding riparian buffers, and other projects. Damaging flooding in 2006 caused the Abrahams Creek Watershed Assessment and Project Prioritization to be created. The creek was used as a reference watershed by the Pennsylvania Department of Environmental Protection when developing a total maximum daily load for the nearby Solomon Creek.

Biology
Nearly all of the watershed of Abrahams Creek is biologically degraded, with the only exceptions being several headwater streams. However, the upper part of the watershed is less severely degraded than the lower reaches.

The drainage basin of Abrahams Creek is designated as a Coldwater Fishery and a Migratory Fishery. Wild trout naturally reproduce in a section of a tributary of the creek in West Wyoming.

There is an herbaceous wetland along Abrahams Creek just upstream of where it enters Frances Slocum Lake. Further to the north, there is a flooded forested wetland. The creek has a substantial riparian buffer upstream of Frances Slocum Lake. The plant species Carex disperma inhabits the area. Bird species such as Virginia rail and Sora inhabit the area as well.

See also
Mill Creek, next tributary of the Susquehanna River going downriver
Lackawanna River, next tributary of the Susquehanna River going upriver
List of rivers of Pennsylvania

References

External links
Google Street View image of Abrahams Creek
Image of Abrahams Creek
Abrahams Creek Watershed Association

Rivers of Luzerne County, Pennsylvania
Tributaries of the Susquehanna River
Rivers of Pennsylvania